The 2019 iK9 Service Dog 200 was a NASCAR Xfinity Series race held on March 9, 2019, at ISM Raceway in Avondale, Arizona. Contested over 200 laps on the  oval, it was the fourth race of the 2019 NASCAR Xfinity Series season.

Entry list

Practice

First practice

Final practice

Qualifying

Qualifying results

Race

Stage Results

Stage One
Laps: 45

Stage Two
Laps: 45

Final Stage Results

Stage Three
Laps: 110

References

2019 in sports in Arizona
iK9 Service Dog 200
NASCAR races at Phoenix Raceway
2019 NASCAR Xfinity Series